The 2020–21 Long Beach State men's basketball team represented California State University, Long Beach, in the 2020–21 NCAA Division I men's basketball season. The Beach were led by 14th-year head coach Dan Monson and played their home game at the Walter Pyramid in Long Beach, California as a member of the Big West Conference. In a season limited due to the ongoing COVID-19 pandemic, they finished the season 6–12, 4–8 in Big West play to finish in ninth place. They defeated Cal State Northridge in the first round of the Big West tournament before losing to UC Santa Barbara in the quarterfinals.

Previous season 
Long Beach State finished the 2019–20 season 11–21, 6–10 in Big West play to finish in a tie for seventh place. The Big West tournament was canceled due to the ongoing COVID-19 pandemic effectively ending the 49ers season.

Roster

Schedule and results 

|-
!colspan=12 style=|Regular season

|-                                 
!colspan=9 style=|Big West tournament

Source:

References 

Long Beach State Beach men's basketball seasons
Long Beach State
2020 in sports in California